Marius Matheron (5 August 1893 – 15 April 1980) was a French racing cyclist. He rode in the 1920 Tour de France.

References

1893 births
1980 deaths
French male cyclists
Place of birth missing